Iceland was represented at the Eurovision Song Contest 1993 by Inga with the song "Þá veistu svarið". Inga was the winner of the Icelandic national final, Söngvakeppni Sjónvarpsins 1993, organised by Icelandic broadcaster Ríkisútvarpið (RÚV).

Before Eurovision

Söngvakeppni Sjónvarpsins 1993 
The final was held on 20 February 1993 at the RÚV studios in Reykjavík, hosted by Steinn Ármann Magnússon. 10 songs competed, with the winner being selected by the votes of nine juries - eight regional juries and a final professional jury.

The winner was "Þá veistu svarið" performed by Ingibjörg Stefánsdóttir. The song was composed by Jon Kjell Seljeseth and Friðrik Sturluson.

At Eurovision 
Ingibjörg, now as Inga, performed 9th on the night of the contest, held in Millstreet, Ireland, following Malta and preceding Austria. Inga received 42 points for her performance of "Þá veistu svarið", placing 13th of 25 competing countries.

Voting

References

External links 
Icelandic National Final 1993

1993
Countries in the Eurovision Song Contest 1993
Eurovision